Henry David “Bud” Molin, A.C.E., (May 26, 1925 – May 21, 2007) was an American film editor and television director.

Biography

Early life and career
Born in Los Angeles, California, Molin enlisted in the United States Army, and served in World War II before beginning his career. He first worked at the Columbia Pictures film library and then became an assistant film editor.

Most of Molin's best known work is in the comedy genre, having edited shows such as I Love Lucy, The Dick Van Dyke Show, and I Spy. He often worked with Dann Cahn and also collaborated with Carl Reiner on some his comedies of the 1970s and 80s, which ranged from the commercial success of Oh, God! and The Jerk to experimental pictures such as Dead Men Don't Wear Plaid and Bert Rigby, You're a Fool. Although best known for comedy, he also edited dramas as well, such as They Call Me Mister Tibbs! and Halls of Anger, both dealing with racial relations.

As his career progressed, Molin branched out to directing the television series Good Heavens, and served as the assistant director on the film Up the Academy. He also was a post-production executive for the TV series Barney Miller. In 1993, Molin came out of retirement to edit his last film, the comedy Fatal Instinct, a film by friend Carl Reiner.

Death
On May 21, 2007, Molin died at his home at the age of 81 in Rancho Mirage, California.

Selected filmography

Director
 The New Dick Van Dyke Show (1 episode, 1974)
 Good Heavens (1 episode, 1976)

Editor
 Our Miss Brooks (4 episodes, 1952–1953)
 Forever, Darling (1956)
 Whirlybirds (3 episodes, 1957)
 I Love Lucy (105 episodes, 1953–1957)
 The Lucy-Desi Comedy Hour (4 episodes, 1958–1959)
 The Guns of Will Sonnett (1 episode, 1967)
 How Sweet It Is! (1968)
 Where's Poppa? (1970)
 The Brothers O'Toole (1973)
 The One and Only (1978)
 Bloodline (1979)
 Dead Men Don't Wear Plaid (1982)
 The Man with One Red Shoe (1985)
 Summer Rental (1985)
 Police Academy 3: Back in Training (1986)
 Summer School (1987)
 The Experts (1989)
 Stella (1990)
 Sibling Rivalry (1990)

Award nominations

References

External links

1925 births
2007 deaths
American film editors
United States Army personnel of World War II
American television directors
People from Los Angeles
United States Army soldiers